Fortunate Youth is an American reggae rock sextet from Hermosa Beach, California.

History

Formation and Up-Lifted EP (2009–2010)
Fortunate Youth was formed in 2009 in Hermosa Beach, California by Travis Walpole, Dan Kelly, Jered Draskovich, Corey Draskovich and Greg Gelb during the birthday party of their friend and longtime manager, Jared Segawa. Gelb, Walpole, and Gonzales, along with Jered and Corey Draskovich, attended Mira Costa High School together prior to the band's formation. While in Rude Boy Roots Travis Walpole & Manager Jared Segawa witnessed singer Dan Kelly perform at an Open Mic Night in Hermosa Beach and recruited him to join the band. After their disbandment the remaining members (Walpole, Draskovich and Kelly) brought on Jered's younger brother Corey and Greg Gelb, who were members of the band Irie State of Mind, to play bass. They also added Ryan "Gonzo" Gonzales on guitar and Myles Poydras on drums.

Ever since the band's formation, Fortunate Youth is devoted to its roots with one simple mission; "spread peace, love, and unity with music". They released their first EP, Up-Lifted, on January 8, 2010.

Irie State of Mind and It's All A Jam (2011–2013)

One year later on July 11, 2011, Fortunate Youth released their debut album Irie State of Mind, premiering at #2 on the iTunes reggae charts and peaking at #13 on Billboard's Top 100 Reggae Albums Chart.

The artwork and conceptual layout for the album was developed and created by Redondo Beach, California artist and photographer Mike Davids, a close friend of the band. That same year, Fortunate Youth supported Tribal Seeds during their Tribal Youth Tour, and released their first single "One Love" in November 2011. The band also toured briefly with Hawaii-based reggae band The Green.

In 2012, Fortunate Youth toured with The Expendables and Tribal Seeds while heavily promoting Irie State of Mind. In September that year, Fortunate Youth performed a stripped-down acoustic set featuring songs from both the Up-Lifted EP and Irie State of Mind during a Moboogie Loft Session. They released an album version of this performance titled, Moboogie Loft Session with Fortunate Youth on December 18, 2012. During 2012, the band headlined their own Nationwide Sweet Summer Love Tour, as well as four shows in Costa Rica, marking their first overseas performances.

They released their sophomore album, It's All A Jam on March 19, 2013. The album peaked at #1 on the Billboard Reggae charts, #10 at the Billboard Pacific Heatseekers Chart, #23 at the Billboard National Heatseekers Chart, #1 on the iTunes Reggae Charts and #46 on the iTunes Overall charts.

In 2013, Fortunate Youth headlined a nationwide tour with fifty-five shows and played the California Roots Music and Arts Festival.

Don't Think Twice (2014–2016)
Fortunate Youth headlined a tour in the spring of 2014, and headlined the 2014 Fall With Friends Tour accompanied by supporting acts such as The Steppas, New Kingston, Ashes of Babylon, Thrive, and The Expanders.

The band released a six-song extended play, The Dub Collections, Vol. 1 that same year and began recording their third album, Don't Think Twice, which was released on May 5, 2015. The album hit the #1 spot on both the Billboard and iTunes Reggae charts at the time of its release, and kicked off a "Don't Think Twice Fall Tour" that October. While discussing the album, Kelly stated the meaning behind the record was, "Don't think twice, we all end up at the same place. If you look at the back of the album, two roads come back into each other. Y'know, no matter what you think, it's all gonna be...alright."

In 2016, the band released their first official music video entitled "Burn One". The video was filmed at the members' place of residence in Redondo Beach.

That same year, they released Love Is The Most High, a compilation of love songs near Valentine's Day. Then quickly released their third EP, Dub Collections, Vol. 2 and began recording their self-titled fourth album at 17th Street Recording Studio in Costa Mesa, California, where they had previously recorded Irie State of Mind, It's All A Jam, and Don't Think Twice.

Fortunate Youth was added as a supporting act in Stick Figure's 2016 Set In Stone tour.

Self-titled album & Live From California (2017–2020)
In January 2017, they released a music video for "Left My Love In California." On February 3, they released another music video for the song "Friends and Family." On February 10, Fortunate Youth released their eponymous fourth album. The album peaked at #1 on the iTunes and Billboard Reggae Albums charts, and #29 on the Billboard Independent Albums chart. It remained in the Top 10 for five weeks. The album featured artists such as Slightly Stoopid and Kumar Bent.

On March 2, the band released yet another music video, "Things", and launched their Spring Tour to promote their fourth album on March 16, 2017, in Ventura, California, with supporting acts such as Josh Heinrichs, Iya Terra, and For Peace Band. On May 26, 2017, they released the music video for "Vibes".

In 2019, they collaborated with reggae musician Half Pint to record on their instrumental of "Pass the Herb". The collaboration was released as a limited edition vinyl during their subsequent tour, in addition to a music video being released. The band added Hawaii's Revelation Kalauli on drums after the departure of Jordan Rosenthal.

The band held an annual Thanksgiving show at Hermosa Beach venue Saint Rocke as a tribute to their city of origin from 2011 to 2019. Saint Rocke closed in 2020 as a result of statewide closures during the COVID-19 pandemic.

On May 22, 2020, Fortunate Youth released a live album titled, Live From California, a 20-song live performance set featuring the band's greatest hits.

In January 2021, Fortunate Youth was one of several reggae and punk bands on The House That Bradley Built, a charity compilation honoring Sublime's lead singer Bradley Nowell, helping musicians with substance abuse. They covered Sublime's song "Jailhouse" on Disc 2 of the Deluxe Edition.

Good Times (Roll On) (2021)

Fortunate Youth recorded their fifth album, Good Times (Roll On), which released on September 30, 2021. Starting in July 2020, mid-lockdown during the COVID-19 pandemic, the album went through pre-production recordings at Kona Town Studio in Redondo Beach, California and then they tracked key essentials at the legendary Total Access Recording (Sublime, Pennywise). The band also worked with reggae producer Lewis Richards at 17th Street Studios in Costa Mesa, California and tracked the horns remotely at Kromatic Sound recording studio on the east coast.

Jered Draskovich describes the album's title, "We are all living through this global event and to me we chose the title to help ensure that 'Good Times' are indeed going to 'Roll On' regardless of all the hardships that our recent environment has provided for everyone." Instead of 3 to 4 weeks, they worked on the album for nine months. Cory Draskovich adds, "2020 was a tough year, especially for the touring music industry. With the down time at home, we were able to spread out the sessions and take our time." 

The 12 track album features special guests including, FY's touring horn section (trumpet and saxophone), Nathan Feinstein of Iya Terra, former FY guitarist, Gonzo currently of Tribal Seeds on background vocals, Italy's reggae twins Mellow Mood, and Skillinjah & Dread Kennedy.

According to FY's Facebook page, Good Times (Roll On) is being considered for the 64th Annual Grammy Awards for Best Reggae Album.

Musical Influences
The band has incorporated a wide variety of influences, including blues, ska, rock and punk into their sound, and cite acts such as Bob Marley, Katchafire, Van Morrison and The Grateful Dead as various influences.

Other projects
Since 2013, Fortunate Youth teamed up with L.A. Ale Works to create a special beer and 40-ounce can; first starting with a double-dry pale ale named "Sweet Sensi" after their song from It's All A Jam album. Next they developed a dry-hopped lager called "Live Life" from their 2019 EP of the same name. Then to commemorate the band's 2021 album, the brewing company came out with "Let the Good Times Roll On", a hazy IPA infused with pineapple and guava juice.

In October 2021, Fortunate Youth teamed up with The Wine Boss (Paso Robles) for a limited edition and hand numbered bottles of Cabernet Franc and Chenin Blanc, both named after their latest album, "Good Times Roll On". The 2018 Cabernet Franc O.G. edition bottle features dark berries, herbs and spices, while the 2019 Chenin Blanc blue edition bottle features flavors of citrus and pear. Both bottles are numbered to 200. 

Fortunate Youth teamed up with Dixxon Flannel Co. for a collaboration of a
men's woven, short sleeve button up "party shirt". It's a black shirt with the band's mascot, a green, red, and yellow banana smoking a joint as a print throughout the shirt, as well as a left chest pocket with a Fortunate Youth brand tag.

Lineup
The lineup has no set designated musician, and all members rotate positions within the band during live performances.

Current band members
 Dan Kelly – Lead Vocals (2009–Present)
 Travis "Travi Bongo" Walpole – Percussion, Guitar, Backing Vocals (2009–Present)
 Jered Draskovich – Keyboard, Bass (2009–Present)
 Greg Gelb – Bass, Guitar (2009–Present)
 Corey Draskovich – Guitar, Bass Keyboard (2009–Present) 
 Revelation Kalauli – Drums (2019–Present)

Past band members
 Ryan "Gonzo" Gonzales – Lead Guitar, Backing Vocals (2009–2011)
 Myles Poydras – Drums (2009–2010)
 Sam Mandelbaum – Drums (2011–2013)
 Evan Hein – Bass (2012)
 Jordan D. Rosenthal – Drums (2013–2018) 
 Joey "Hawaiiantist" Muraoka – Drums (2014)

Discography

Studio albums

Extended Plays (EPs)

Live albums

Singles

References

External links
 Official Website
 Official YouTube Channel

American reggae musical groups
Reggae rock groups
Musical groups from California